This is a partial list of South Korean television series or programmes:

Animation
 The Haunted House (anime) (신비아파트)
 Battle Beadman
 Chaotic
 Duel Masters
 Fire Beadman (천하통일 파이어비드맨)
 Jang Geum's Dream (장금이의 꿈)
 Komi
 Larva
 Maskman
 Mix Master
 Nalong (뚜루뚜루뚜 나롱이)
 Nalong 2 (쾌걸롱맨 나롱이)
 Origami Warriors (접지전사)
 Pororo the Little Penguin
 Shadow Fighter 
 Spheres (TV series)
 The Raspberry Times
 Tori Go! Go!

News

General News
 JTBC Newsroom (JTBC 뉴스룸)
 KBS News 9 (KBS 뉴스9) 
 KBS ACHiMP NEWS TiME (KBS 아침 뉴스 타임)
 MBC Newsdesk (MBC 뉴스데스크)
 SBS 8 News (SBS 8시 뉴스)
Note: MBC Newsdesk and SBS 8 News are also aired on MBC Music MBC and SBS MTV SBS's music channels.

Showbiz News
 tvN eNews 9
 SBS KSTAR News 840 (Pre-empted by local newscasts.)
 MBC Showbizdesk 840 (Pre-empted by local newscasts.)
 KBS Entertainment Relay (Weekly Show)
 Mnet WiDE NEWS

Current affairs

Ombudsman and mass communication
 Arguments (썰전)
 Curious Story Y (궁금한 이야기 Y)
 Current Magazine 2580 (시사매거진 2580)
 Knowledge Channel e (지식채널 e)
 PD Notebook (PD 수첩)
 The Its Know (그것이 알고싶다)
 Vivid Sources of Information (생생정보통)
 VJ Trooper (VJ 특공대)
 X-files about Food (먹거리 X파일)

Studio show

Comedy
 Comedy Big League (코미디빅리그)
 Gag Concert (개그콘서트)
 Ha ttang sa (하땅사)
 People Looking for Laughter (웃음을 찾는 사람들) or Wootchatsa (웃찾사)
 Saturday Night Live Korea SNL KORea (새터데이 나이트 라이브 코리아)

Music
 Golden Oldies (KBS1 가요무대)
 Inkigayo (SBS 인기가요)
 Jung Jae-hyung & Lee Hyo-ri's You and I
 KBS Lee Hana's Peppermint (이하나의 페퍼민트)
 KBS Live Music Warehouse (라이브 음악창고)
 KBS Yoon Do Hyun's loveletter (윤도현의 러브레터)
 Kim Jung-eun's Chocolate (김정은의 초콜릿)
 Korea Local Music Show (전국 노래자랑)
 M! Countdown (Mnet) (M 카운트 다운)
 MBC Kim Dong Ryul's For You (김동률의 포 유)
 MBC Music Camp (음악캠프)
 MBC Music Travel LaLaLa (음악여행 라라라)
 Music Bank (TV series)|Music Bank (KBS) (뮤직뱅크)
 SBS Music Space (음악공간)
 SBS Music Wave (뮤직웨이브)
 Show! Music Core (MBC) (쇼! 음악중심)
 Superstar K (Mnet) (슈퍼스타 K)
 You Hee-Yeol's Sketchbook

Entertainment
 KBS Entertainment Broadcast Show (KBS 연예가중계)
 SBS TV Entertainment Show (SBS TV 연예)
 Section TV (섹션 TV 연예통신)

Talk show
 Dissatisfaction Zero (불만제로)
 Find Delicious TV (찾아라 맛있는 TV)
 Global Talk Show (미녀들의 수다)
 GO Show
 Golden Fishery
 Hwasin - Controller of the Heart
 I Am a Man (나는 남자다)
 Non-Summit (비정상회담)
 Radio Star (TV series) (라디오스타)
 SBS Lotto Show (SBS 생방송 브라보 나눔로또)
 Shocking of the World (순간포착 세상에 이런일이)
 Sponge (TV series) Sponge (스펀지)
 Strong Heart (TV series)

Variety
 1 Night 2 Days (1박2일)
 24/365 BY BLACKPINK
 2NE1 TV
 Apink's Showtime (에이핑크의 쇼타임)
 Barefooted Friends (맨발의 친구들)
 Be Stupid
 Beast Showtime(쇼타임: 버닝 더 비스트)
 Beatles Code Season 2
 BLACK CAST
 Boyfriend's W Military Academy
 Boys and Girls Music Guide
 Carefree Travelers (뭉쳐야 뜬다)
 Come to Play (놀러와)
 Dad! Where Are We Going? (아빠! 어디가?) 
 Dancing 9 (댄싱9)
 Duet Song Festival (듀엣가요제)
 DoReMi Market  ( 도레미 마켓) 
 Enemy of Broadcasting
 EXO's Showtime (엑소의 쇼타임)
 Factory Girl (reality show)
 Family Outing (패밀리가 떴다)
 Fun & Joy
 Gag Star
 Get it Beauty
 Girls' Generation Goes to School
 Going Seventeen
 Goldfish (TV series) (황금어장)
 Good Sunday (일요일이 좋다)
 HaHa-Mong Show
 Happy Sunday (해피선데이)
 Happy Together (2001 TV series) (해피투게더)
 Hello Baby
 Heroes Variety Show
 I Live Alone (TV series) (나 혼자 산다)
 Idol Battle
 Idol Master
 Idol Room (아이돌룸)
 Idol School
 Idol Show
 Image Fighter 2013
 Immortal Songs (불멸의 노래 2)
 Infinite Challenge (무한도전)
 Infinite Showtime
 Invincible Youth (청춘불패)
 It's Dangerous Beyond the Blanket!
 JJANG!
 K-Pop Star Hunt
 Kara Bakery
 King of Mask Singer (미스터리 음악쇼 복면가왕)
 Knowing Bros (아는 형님)
 Korea's Got Talent
 Lee Hyo Ri's X sister
 Let Me In
 Let's Go! Dream Team (출발 드림팀)
 Life Bar
 Love & Hate
 M-GIGS
 M;terview
 M Tunes
 Master Key
 Mix & Match
 MLive
 Mnet Special
 Mnet Star
 Moonlight Prince
 Music and Lyric (음악 및 가사)
 Music Spotlight
 Nicole The Entertainer's Introduction to Veterinary Science
 Night Star
 Oh! Brothers (오! 부라더스)
 Oh! My School
 Our Neighborhood Arts and Physical Education (우리동네 예능과 체육의 능력자) / (Cool Kiz on the Block)
 Photo Camping Video Log
 Please Take Care of My Refrigerator (냉장고를 부탁해)
 Rain Effect
 Real Homme
 Real Men (TV series) (진짜 사나이)
 Roommate (TV series)
 Running Man (TV series) (런닝맨)
 Secret (비밀)
 Sesame Player
 Shinhwa Broadcast
 Sister's Slam Dunk (언니들의 슬램덩크)
 Society Game
 Spring, Summer, Fall, Winter Forest
 Star Golden Bell (스타골든벨)
 Star King (Korean TV show) (놀라운 대회 스타킹)
 Strong Heart (Korean TV show) (강심장)
 Sunday Sunday Night (일요일 일요일 밤에)
 SuperTV
 Superhit
 Super Idol Chart Show
 Superstar K
 Sweet Girl (Chuseok Special)
 Talking Street (말하는대로)
 Taxi: The Talk Show
 The Romantic & Idol
 The Voice Kids
 The Voice of Korea
 This Is Infinite
 Trot X
 Twice TV
 We Got Married (우리 결혼했어요)
 Weekly Idol
 WIN: Who is Next
 Win Win (승승장구)
 WINNER TV
 Wonder Bakery
 X-Man (TV series) (X맨 일요일이 좋다)

Sports
 KBS Sports World (스포츠 세상)
 Top Gear Korea
 Viva! K-League (비바 K리그)

Special events
 KBS Drama Awards (KBS 연기대상)
 KBS Song Festival (KBS 가요대상)
 MBC Drama Awards (MBC 연기대상)
 MBC Entertainment Awards (MBC 방송연예대상)
 MBC University Music Festival (MBC 대학가요제)
 SBS Drama Awards (SBS 연기대상)

Dramas

Documentary
 KBS History Special (KBS 역사 스페셜)
 KBS Special (KBS 스페셜)
 MBC Special (MBC 스페셜)
 SBS Special (SBS 스페셜)

Voice-overs

TV edition movie
 KBS Movie Theatre (KBS 명화극장)
 KBS Saturday Movie (KBS 토요명화)
 MBC Friday Movie Heaven (MBC 금요영화천국)
 MBC Weekend of Movie (MBC 주말의 명화)
 SBS Cine Club (SBS 씨네클럽)
 SBS Movie Express (SBS 영화특급)

See also

 List of South Korean broadcasting networks
 List of programs broadcast by Arirang TV
 List of programs broadcast by Korean Broadcasting System
 List of programs broadcast by Munhwa Broadcasting Corporation
 List of programs broadcast by Seoul Broadcasting System
 List of programs broadcast by JTBC
 List of North Korean television series

References